Darren is the first studio album by Filipino-Canadian singer Darren Espanto. It was released on December 10, 2014 under MCA Music Inc. It is the most expensive studio album by a Filipino artist.

Espanto had a press conference on February 17, 2015 to officially launch his debut album. The album, immediately upon release in the Philippines, debuted at number-one on the Apple's iTunes store and Astro Chart, making Darren the youngest artist in the Philippines to reach the top spot on the chart solo. As of August 2015, the album has sold 15,000+ units and is now a certified Platinum.

Recording 
For Darren, Espanto worked with local and international producers and most respected composers. The album features the carrier single “In Love Ako sa ’Yo,” (I'm In love with you) a Vehnee Saturno composition. The latter contributed three more selections to the album – “My Girl,” “Ewan Ko,” (I don't know) and “Ah! Basta Gusto Kita.” (Whatever! I like you)

Another local composer Kennard Faraon wrote “Stuck” for the album. The rest of the tracks in “Darren” were penned by foreign composers – Keith Martin and Deon Hairston for “You Are the Only One,” Adrian Rezza, Lucas Rezza and Carvin Winans for “I Believe in Me,” and Fil-Am Brad Go for “Makin’ Moves.” A bonus track in the album is the studio version of Jessie J's “Domino” which Darren performed during The Voice Kids Philippines’ blind audition

Promotion
Before the release of the album, Darren had a concert tour in the Philippines and abroad where he performed, "In Love Ako Sayo"(I'm In Love with you). He also performed Stuck and Ewan ko (I don't  know) from his self-titled album during his album mall tour in Fisher Mall. A Grand Fans Day has been scheduled on December 21, 2014 at Robinsons Forum where the album will also be promoted. On February 17, 2015 Espanto had a press conference to officially launch his debut album.

Singles
 "In Love Ako Sayo" (I'm In Love with you) is the carrier single of the album and premiered on radio stations nationwide on November 14, 2014. It was written by Vehnee Saturno

Track listing

Certifications

Release history

References

2014 debut albums
Tagalog-language albums
Universal Music Group albums